Roswell Bottum may refer to: 

Roswell Bottum (farmer) (1796–1877), American farmer and politician 
Roswell Bottum (lawyer) (1902–1971), American lawyer and politician